IC programming is the process of transferring a computer program into an integrated computer circuit.  Older types of IC including PROMs and EPROMs and some early programmable logic was typically programmed through parallel busses that used many of the device's pins and basically required inserting the device in a separate programmer.

Modern ICs are typically programmed in circuit though a serial protocol (sometimes JTAG sometimes something manufacturer specific).  Some (particularly FPGAs) even load the data serially from a separate flash or prom chip on every startup.

Notes

Embedded systems